Bells Line of Road is a  major road located in New South Wales, Australia, providing an alternative crossing of the Blue Mountains to the Great Western Highway.

The route, part of the traditional Aboriginal pathway network, was shown to Archibald Bell, Jr. by Darug men Emery and Cogy in 1823. Subsequently, he was accompanied by the Government Assistant Surveyor and the route marked was known as Bell's Line, to be later cleared to become the second road across the Blue Mountains. Due to its condition and the gradients around Mount Tomah it was rarely used before World War II. The road was improved between 1939 and 1943, as an alternative to the Great Western Highway for the war effort. At the same time that it was improved, the road from Bell via Scenic Hill to Lithgow was built, so that the Darling Causeway (the conjoining road connecting Bell and Mount Victoria) carries relatively little traffic, but is a significant tourist route.

Today, the route is still used as an alternative route across the Blue Mountains and is also a popular tourist drive.

Route
The eastern terminus of Bells Line of Road as an identified route began at the edge of the town of Richmond, but now officially begins at the Richmond Bridge across the Hawkesbury River. At Bellbird Hill it then proceeds to climb onto the Bell Range of the Blue Mountains, passing through Kurrajong Heights. When on the range, it proceeds through the fruit-growing areas of Bilpin and Berambing, before climbing and descending Mount Tomah, passing by the Mount Tomah Botanic Gardens. After Mount Tomah it proceeds through the Blue Mountains National Park passing Mount Bell and Mount Charles and passing close to Pierces Pass and Mount Banks.  before Bell is the turn off to the villages of Mount Wilson and Mount Irvine. At the village of Bell, Bells Line of Road turns south to run along the crest of the Darling Causeway to Mount Victoria, passing the site of the now-demolished Hartley Vale railway station.

The route has numerous sections of steep and winding road. The road is steep with a grade of 1:8 and has several tight bends. Other steep sections include the east and west ascents of Mount Tomah and Mount Bell as well as "The Glen" on the west side of Kurrajong Heights.

Alternative routes
The next trafficable road north of Bells Line of Road that crosses the Blue Mountains is the Bylong Valley Way, which forms a more direct route between the Central West region and the Hunter Region, including the port of Newcastle, NSW.

History
The passing of the Main Roads Act of 1924 through the Parliament of New South Wales provided for the declaration of Main Roads, roads partially funded by the State government through the Main Roads Board (later the Department of Main Roads, and eventually Transport for NSW). Main Road No. 184 was declared along this road on 8 August 1928, from Richmond, via Bilpin to Bell (and continuing southwards along Darling Causeway to the intersection with Great Western Highway at Mount Victoria, and continuing eastwards via Windsor along Windsor Road to Parramatta).

The route was allocated part of State Route 40 in 1974. With the conversion to the newer alphanumeric system in 2013, this was replaced with route B59.

Lowered speed limits
In November 2007, the Roads and Traffic Authority (RTA) announced plans to lower the speed limits along much of Bells Line of Road. Within a week, sufficient opposition was expressed that the changes were put on hold. In October 2008, the same changes were again announced, with the RTA claiming that there had been community consultation, but numerous users of the road, including politicians and councillors based west of the Blue Mountains, claimed to have been unaware of any consultation. As a result of the changes, the maximum speed limit east of Bell is now .

Junctions

Future
For many years, road-lobby groups have been pushing for what they call a "superhighway" across the Blue Mountains. They claim that the poor roads across the Blue Mountains are impeding economic growth west of the Mountains.

In 2002, road-lobby groups secured $2 million in funding for a feasibility study into building a freeway following Bells Line of Road. The proposed freeway would have linked to the M2 Hills Motorway in Sydney and connected to the Great Western Highway west of Lithgow via a route across the Newnes Plateau. The study report, published in November 2004 concluded that, while feasible to build from an engineering perspective, it would not be economically feasible and would have massive impact on adjacent national parks and local communities.

The Great Western Highway has been the main route across the Blue Mountains since its construction in 1815, but after the above studies found that a freeway would be too expensive to build along the route of Bell's Line of Road, the idea was abandoned. However Roads and Maritime Services' 2017 road corridor improvement program  provides for a somewhat more modest program of upgradings. It is also revisiting studies last undertaken in the 1960s to extend the planned Castlereagh Freeway (subsequently partly-built as the M2) to connect with Bell's Line of Road at Kurrajong Heights. If this project were to be implemented it would force major improvements to be undertaken to the route followed by Bell's Line of Road, due to the traffic volumes that would be generated by a freeway. Conversely, a freeway could not be justified without a major capacity increase on the Bell's Line of Road route.

See also

 List of Blue Mountains articles
 Highways in Australia
 List of highways in New South Wales

References

External links
 Bells Line of Road on Google Maps
 Bells Line of Road: History and Development on Ozroads
 

Roads in New South Wales
Transport in the Blue Mountains (New South Wales)